Tatyana Borisovna Dmitrieva (December 21, 1951 – March 1, 2010) was a Russian psychiatrist, a member of the Russian Academy of Medical Sciences and Health minister. During the period of 1998-2010, she headed the Serbsky Center. She is the Director of the Serbsky State Research Centre for Social and Forensic Psychiatry in Moscow, which is responsible for forensic psychiatry for criminal courts. She is also the Head of the Department for Social and Forensic Psychiatry at the Sechenov Medical Academy of Moscow and Vice-Chairperson of the Russian Society of Psychiatrists and Narcologists.

Publications

T.B. Dmitrieva had published 350 scientific works, including 22 monographs. Some of her significant papers are:

References 

Russian psychiatrists
1951 births
2010 deaths
Russian women psychiatrists
Women government ministers of Russia
Burials in Troyekurovskoye Cemetery
Health ministers of Russia